Minam Lake is a high-elevation reservoir in the Eagle Cap Wilderness of the Wallowa Mountains in the U.S. state of Oregon. The unusual reservoir, a modified natural lake, has outlets on both its north and south ends. The south outlet drains to the Minam River, and the north outlet is the source of the Lostine River.

A natural lake at this spot had only a south outlet. The dam's purpose was to store additional water and to deflect it north for irrigation of farms in the Lostine Valley.

It is said that minam is a word that evolved in the mid-19th century from the native word e-mi-ne-mah. The latter referred to the Minam River Valley, where a kind of plant with edible roots grew in abundance. Mah was a suffix meaning valley or canyon.

See also
 List of lakes in Oregon

References

Eagle Cap Wilderness
Reservoirs in Oregon
Lakes of Wallowa County, Oregon